Malatya (Syriac ܡܠܝܛܝܢܐ Malīṭīná; ; Ancient Greek: Μελιτηνή) is a large city in the Eastern Anatolia region of Turkey and the capital of Malatya Province. The city has been a human settlement for thousands of years. 

In Hittite, melid or milit means "honey", offering a possible etymology for the name, which was mentioned in the contemporary sources of the time under several variations (e.g., Hittite: Malidiya and possibly also Midduwa; Akkadian: Meliddu; Urar̩tian: Meliṭeia).

Strabo says that the city was known "to the ancients" as Melitene (Ancient Greek Μελιτηνή), a name adopted by the Romans following Roman expansion into the east. According to Strabo, the inhabitants of Melitene shared with the nearby Cappadocians and Cataonians the same language and culture.

The site of ancient Melitene lies a few kilometres from the modern city in what is now the village of Arslantepe and near the district center of Battalgazi (Byzantine to Ottoman Empire). Present-day Battalgazi was the location of the city of Malatya until the 19th century, when a gradual move of the city to the present third location began. Battalgazi's official name was Eskimalatya (Old Malatya); until recently, it was a name used locally. In Turkey the city is renowned for its apricots, as up to 80% of the Turkish apricot production is provided by Malatya, giving Malatya the name kayısı diyarı ("apricot realm").

In February 2023, the city suffered huge damage as a result of the Turkey–Syria earthquake.

History

Arslantepe 

Arslantepe has been inhabited since the development of agriculture in the Fertile Crescent, nearly 6,000 years ago. From the Bronze Age, the site became an administrative center of a larger region in the kingdom of Isuwa. The city was heavily fortified. The Hittites conquered the city in the fourteenth century B.C. In the Hittite language, melid or milit means "honey." The name was mentioned in the contemporary sources under several variations (e.g., Hittite: Malidiya and possibly also Midduwa; Akkadian: Meliddu; Urar̩tian: Meliṭeia).

After the end of the Hittite Empire, the city became the center of the Neo-Hittite state of Kammanu. The city continued old Hittite traditions and styles. Researchers have discovered a palace inside the city walls with statues and reliefs. A palace was erected with monumental stone sculptures of lions and the ruler. Kammanu was a vassal state of Urartu between 804 and 743.

According to Igor Diakonoff and John Greppin, there was likely an Armenian presence in Melid by 1200 BCE.

The Neo-Assyrian king Tiglath-Pileser I (1115–1077 B.C.) forced the kingdom of Malidiya to pay tribute to Assyria. The Neo-Assyrian king Sargon II (722–705) sacked the city in 712 BC. At the same time, the Cimmerians and Scythians invaded Anatolia and the city declined. Some occupation continued on the site into the Hellenistic and Roman periods—a smithy with four ovens has been excavated from the Roman period. There was a long gap in occupation between the mid-7th century and renewed use of the site in the late 12th or early 13th century.

Archeologists first began to excavate the site of Arslantepe in the 1930s, led by French archaeologist Louis Delaporte. Since 1961 an Italian team of archaeologists, led by Marcella Frangipane in the early 21st century, has been working at the site.

From the 6th century BC, Melid was ruled by the Armenian Orontid Dynasty, who were subjects of the Achaemenid Empire. After periods of Achaemenid and Macedonian rule, Melid (Malatya) was part of the Kingdom of Lesser Armenia.

Melitene during the Roman Empire 

Diodorus Siculus wrote that Ptolemaeus of Commagene attacked and captured the Melitene from the Kingdom of Cappadocia, but couldn't keep it for long since Ariarathes V of Cappadocia marched against him, with a strong army, and Ptolemaeus withdrew.
The Kingdom of Cappadocia, ruled by the House of Ariobarzanes (95–36 BC), became a Roman client in 63 BC. After the Kingdom's annexation by the Roman Empire in 17 AD, the settlement was re-established as Melitene in 72 AD on a different site, as the base camp of Legio XII Fulminata (which continued to be based there until at least the early 5th century according to Notitia Dignitatum). The legionary base of Melitene controlled access to southern Armenia and the upper Tigris. It was the end point of the important highway running east from Caesarea (modern Kayseri). The camp attracted a civilian population and was probably granted city status by Trajan in the early 2nd century AD, with the rank of Municipium. It is known for being a prolific source of imperial coins minted from the 3rd to the early 5th centuries.

Procopius wrote admiringly of the temples, agoras and theatres of Melitene, but no evidence of them now remains. It was a major center in the province of Armenia Minor ( Pokr Hayk,) created by Diocletian from territory separated from the province of Cappadocia. In 392 A.D., emperor Theodosius I divided Armenia Minor into two new provinces: First Armenia, with its capital at Sebasteia (modern Sivas); and Second Armenia, with its capital at Melitene.

Middle Ages and Ottoman rule 

During the reign of the Emperor Justinian I (527–565), administrative reforms were carried out in this region: The province of Second Armenia was renamed Third Armenia (Armenia Tertia), with its territory unchanged and its capital still at Melitene. Melitene's city walls were constructed in the 6th century by the emperors Anastasius and Justinian. Those that still stand mostly date from the Arab period, perhaps of the 8th century, though retaining the layout of and some remnants from earlier building phases. The city was captured by the Rashidun Caliphate in 638. It then became a base for their raids deeper into the Byzantine Empire, a policy continued by the Abbasids. In the 9th century, under its semi-independent emir Umar al-Aqta, Malatya rose to become a major opponent of the Byzantine Empire until Umar was defeated and killed at the Battle of Lalakaon in 863. The Byzantines attacked the city many times, but did not finally take it until the campaigns of John Kourkouas in 927–934. After successively accepting and renouncing vassal status, the city was finally taken in May 934, its Muslim inhabitants driven out or forced to convert, and replaced by Greek and Armenian settlers.

The West Syrian diocese of Melitene has been established since the sixth century and was as well surrounded by other bishoprics belonging to nearby towns. In the tenth century the Emperor Nikephoros II Phokas convinced the Jacobite Patriarch of Antioch to move the head of the patriarchate into the region of Melitene. The city was attacked and devastated by the Seljuks in 1058.

In the period that followed the Turkish advance into the Byzantine Empire after the defeat at the Battle of Manzikert, Gabriel of Melitene, a Greek Orthodox Armenian who had risen from the ranks of the Byzantine army, governed the city. From 1086 to 1100 he preserved his independence with the aid of the Beylik of the Danishmends. After 1100, he invested heavily on the commanders of the First Crusade, especially Bohemond I of Antioch and Baldwin of Boulogne.

The Danishmends took over Malatya one year later in 1101 (see Battle of Melitene). With the Anatolian Seljuk Sultanate based in Konya taking over the Beylik of Danishmend in the late 12th century, Malatya became part of their realm. Under Danishmend and Seljuk rule, Malatya became a centre of knowledge as many Persian and Arabic scholars took residence in the city. The Seljuk Sultanate also undertook an extensive development of the city. After being ruled by the Ilkhanids for around 50 years at the end of the 13th century, the Muslim population of the city invited the Mamluk Sultanate to Malatya in 1315. On 28 April 1315, the Mamluk army entered the city; this was followed by the looting of the city by the army. The Eretna Dynasty gained sovereignty over the city for some time, but from 1338 onwards the Mamluks secured its control. However, for the latter part of the 14th century, the control of the city fluctuated between the Mamluks and the Dulkadirids. The city was captured by the Ottoman army led by Yavuz Sultan Selim on 28 July 1516 and remained under Ottoman rule until the establishment of the Republic of Turkey. Under the Ottomans, the city lost the quality of being on the frontiers, as well as the allure it held in the Middle Ages. It was plagued between the 16th and 18th centuries by successive rebellions.

Modern period 

The current city of Malatya was founded in 1838, with the old site of Militene now designated as Old Malatya. The reason behind the displacement of the city center was that the Ottoman army settled and stayed, probably by seizing from its settlers, in the previous city center, in the winter of 1838–39, before taking the road for Battle of Nezib in 1849. Because of this, citizens of the Malatya established the new city based on a near town called Aspuzu. The city saw rapid expansion in the 19th century, and by the end of the century it had around 5000 households, 50 mosques, six madrasas, nine inns and five Turkish baths. Ottoman sources also recorded ten churches. In 1889 and 1890, Malatya was struck by two large fires that destroyed thousands of shops. The city was then hit by the 1893 Malatya earthquake, which killed 1300, destroying 1200 houses and four mosques. A cholera outbreak that subsequently took place in 1893 killed 896 people. The destroyed buildings were rebuilt in 1894.
Malatya was the scene of anti-Armenian violence during the late nineteenth and early twentieth centuries. During the Hamidian Massacres of 1895–1896, 7,500 Armenian civilians were massacred and Armenian villages in the rural countryside of Malatya were destroyed. In the aftermath, a Red Cross team sent to Malatya and led by Julian B. Hubbell concluded that 1,500 Armenian houses had been pillaged and 375 burned to the ground.
According to the 1913 Catholic Encyclopedia, Malatya city was inhabited by 30,000 people with a clear ethnic Turkish majority, and an Armenian population of 3,000, of whom 800 were Catholics. Of the five churches in the city, three belonged to the Armenians. In the spring of 1915, the vast majority of the Armenians of the town were rounded up by Ottoman authorities and deported on death marches as part of the Armenian genocide. According to reports of the governor of the Malatya district, of the 6,935 registered Armenians in Malatya, 197 were left in the town as artisans. In the early Republican era, Malatya became the centre of Malatya Province and enjoyed a substantial growth in terms of population as well as covered area. This development was further accelerated by the construction of the Adana-Fevzipaşa-Malatya railroad in 1931, and a few years later in 1937, by the construction of the Sivas-Malatya railroad.

Until recently the city was home to departments of the Turkish Aeronautical Association, Turkish Hearths, and Turkish Red Crescent. In 2014 Malatya became a metropolitan municipality in Turkey, alongside 12 other cities, by a Turkish governmental law that was passed in 2012. Following the 2014 Turkish local elections the new municipality officially took office. Today the city is generally considered to be a notable trade and industrial hub, as well as a cultural centre point thanks to the İnönü University that was established on 28 January 1975.

Demographics 
According to German geographers Georg Hassel and Adam Christian Gaspari, Malatya was composed of 1200 to 1500 houses in early 19th century, inhabited by Ottomans, Turkmens, Armenians, and Greeks. William Harrison Ainsworth visited the city of Malatya in 1837, noting a population of 8 thousand Muslims, chiefly Turkomans, and 3 thousand Armenians.

Climate 

Malatya has a cold semi-arid climate (Köppen climate classification: BSk) or a temperate continental climate (Trewartha climate classification: Dca), with hot, dry summers and cold, snowy winters.

Economy 

The economy of the city of Malatya is dominated by agriculture, textile manufacturing, and construction. As with the general province, apricot production is important for subsistence in the central district. Malatya is the world leader in apricot production. The city has two organized industrial zones, where the chief industry is textile.

Historically, Malatya produced opium. The British, in 1920, described the opium from Malatya as having "the highest percentage of morphia".

Culture

Cuisine 

Köfte (meatballs) are used in many meals from kebabs (meat broiled or roasted in small pieces) to desserts. There are over 70 kinds of köfte, usually made with wheat and other ingredients. Kağıt kebabı is a local specialty – a dish made of lamb and vegetables broiled in a wrapper, usually oily paper. Other important dishes are a variety of stuffed specialties, including stuffed mulberry leaves, cabbage, chard, lettuce wraps with olive oil, vine leaves, cherry leaves, bean leaves, grape leaves, beets, onions, and zucchini flowers.

The Malatya region is known for its apricot orchards. About 50% of the fresh apricot production and 95% of the dried apricot production in Turkey, the world's leading apricot producer, is provided by Malatya. Overall, about 10–15% of the worldwide crop of fresh apricots, and about 65–80% of the worldwide production of dried apricots comes out of Malatya. Malatya apricots are often sun-dried by family-run orchards using traditional methods before export.

Festivals 

Malatya Fair and Apricot Festivities has been held since 1978, every year in July, to promote Malatya and apricots and to convene the producers to meet one another. During the festivities, sports activities, concerts and apricot contests are organized.

Near the Apricot Festivities, there are other annual activities in summer. Cherry Festivities at Yeşilyurt District of Malatya and Grape Festivities at Arapgir District are organized annually.

Sports 
Malatya's initial team is Malatyaspor whose colors are red and yellow. Malatyaspor competes in Malatya First Amateur League. Malatyaspor plays their home games in Malatya İnönü Stadium in the city's center. Malatya's other team is Yeni Malatyaspor (formerly Malatya Belediyespor) whose colors are black and yellow (formerly green and orange). They compete in Süper Lig.

Administration and politics 

Malatya is administered by a metropolitan municipality, which covers the whole province. There are two central districts, each with their own municipalities, that make up the city of Malatya: these are Battalgazi and Yeşilyurt. Battalgazi has a population of around 300,000 and covers 47 central neighbourhoods, three rural former municipalities and 28 villages. Yeşilyurt contains 36 central neighborhoods, three rural former municipalities and 16 villages, and has a population of around 250,000. The metropolitan municipality was won in 2014 by Ahmet Çakır of the ruling AK Party with 62.9% of the vote; the candidate of the CHP was in the second place with 16.7% of the vote. Battalgazi was won by Selahattin Gürkan of the AK Party with 63.1% of the vote and Yeşilyurt was won Hacı Uğur Polat of the AK Party with 62.4% of the vote. The two central districts voted overwhelmingly in favour of the AK Party in the June 2015 election with AK Party winning 66.2% of the vote in Battalgazi and 56.9% in Yeşilyurt. These percentages further increased in the November 2015 election to 74.7% and 66.2% respectively. In both elections, CHP had the second place in both districts with its votes remaining in the range of 10–18%.

Mayors of Malatya 

 1984-1989 Erdem Seyhan Semercioğlu ANAP
 1989-1994 Ahmet Münir Erkal ANAP
 1994-1998 Ahmet Münir Erkal RP
 1998-1999 Ahmet Münir Erkal FP
 1999-2004 Mehmet Yaşar Çerçi MHP
 2004-2009 Hüseyin Cemal Akın AK Party
 2009-2018 Ahmet Çakır AK Party
 2018-2019 Hacı Uğur Polat AK Party
 2019-current Selahattin Gürkan AK Party

Education 

İnönü University, one of the largest universities in eastern Turkey, is in Malatya. It was established on 28 January 1975 and has three institutions and nine faculties, with more than 2,500 faculty and 20,000 students. Its larger campus is in the eastern part of Malatya.

There are 162 high schools and some of the well-known, national high school entrance examination-based high schools in Malatya are;  Fethi Gemuhluoglu High School of Science, Private Turgut Özal Anatolian High School, Malatya Science High School and Malatya Anatolian High School.

Landmarks 

 Great Mosque of Malatya
 New Mosque

Transportation 

By its relative advance in industrial growth, Malatya is a pole of attraction for its surrounding regions, in commercial and inward immigration. The city is at a key junction in Turkey's road and rail network. By rail, it serves as the junction for Aleppo through Syria–Samsun line. The bus terminal is 5 km west of the city center; there are regular intercity services to and from Ankara, Istanbul and Gaziantep. The railway station is 3 km west of the city center, and daily express trains run to Elazığ, Diyarbakır, Istanbul and Ankara. These stations are easily reached by taxis and dolmuş services.

Construction of a trolleybus line was under way in 2013, and the line opened in March 2015, operating under the name Trambus.

Malatya's airport, Erhaç Airport, is 26  km west of the city center. There are daily domestic flights from Istanbul, Ankara and İzmir. Since 2007 there have been international flights during the summer months. These flights are especially from German cities to Malatya, and most of the passengers are Turkish citizens or their descendants who are living and working in Germany.

Notable people

Sister cities  

  Seoul, South Korea

Notes

Further reading 

 Başgelen, Nezih. Malatya: Bir zamanlar (Malatya: Once upon a time). Ankara, 1998. 
  Alboyajian, Arshag. Պատմութիւն Մալաթիոյ հայոց (The History of Armenian Malatya). Beirut, 1961.

External links 

 Malatya Sivil Toplum Örgütleri Birliği Malatya Sivil Toplum Örgütleri Birliği
 Malatya NetHaber Malatya NetHABER
 Malatya Haber Ajansı Malatya Haberleri
 Malatyam.com Malatya Haber Portalı – Malatya'nın Güncel Haberleri
 Malatya Sonsöz gazetesi Malatya Haberleri
 Malatya Oto Kiralama Malatya Oto Kiralama
 Malatya Haber Malatya Haber

 
Populated places established in 1838
1838 establishments in the Ottoman Empire
Districts of Malatya Province
Roman fortifications in Cappadocia